Myron Nettinga (born 1967) is an American sound engineer. He graduated from the University of Miami with a degree in Music Engineering. He won an Academy Award for Best Sound for the film Black Hawk Down. He has worked on more than 100 films since 1992.

Selected filmography
 FernGully: The Last Rainforest (1992)
 Black Hawk Down (2001)

References

External links

1967 births
Living people
American audio engineers
Best Sound Mixing Academy Award winners